When Pus Comes to Shove is the debut album of the band Platypus.

Track listing 
 Standing in Line - (3:10) 
 Nothing to Say - (4:54) 
 Rock Balls/Destination Unknown - (7:40) 
 Platt Opus - (5:01) 
 I'm with You - (4:13) 
 Blue Plate Special - (7:21) 
 Chimes - (4:45) 
 Willie Brown - (5:03) 
 Bye Bye - (4:51) 
 What About the Merch? - (4:29)

Personnel
 Ty Tabor — guitars, vocals, percussion
 Derek Sherinian — keyboards
 John Myung — bass
 Rod Morgenstein — drums; keyboards on "Chimes"

References

External links
PLATYPUS When Pus Comes to Shove reviews and MP3 @ progarchives.com

1999 debut albums
Platypus (band) albums